Jacundá is a municipality in the state of Pará in the Northern region of Brazil. A considerable part of its economy is based on logging.

See also
List of municipalities in Pará

References

Municipalities in Pará